Ramiro is a Spanish and Portuguese name from the latinisation of the Gothic given name *𐍂𐌰𐌽𐌰𐌼𐌹𐍂 (*Ranamir). Notable people with the name include:

Given name
 Ramiro I of Asturias (c. 790–850), king of Asturias
 Ramiro II of León (c. 900–951), king of Leon
 Ramiro III of León (961–985), king of Leon
 Ramiro I of Aragon (before 1007–1063), king of Aragon
 Ramiro II of Aragon (c. 1075–1157), king of Aragon

A-C
 Ramiro Arias (born 1993), Argentine football defender
 Ramiro Arrue (1892–1971), Basque painter, illustrator, and ceramist
 Ramiro Benavides (born 1947), Bolivian tennis player
 Ramiro Benavides (swimmer) (born 1954), Guatemalan former swimmer
 Ramiro Benetti (born 1993), Brazilian footballer
 Ramiro Blacut (born 1944), Bolivian footballer
 Ramiro Borja, Ecudorean-American soccer player
 Ramiro Bravo (born 1962), Spanish foil fencer
 Ramiro Bruschi (born 1981), Uruguayan football forward
 Ramiro Cabrera (born 1988), Uruguayan cyclist
 Ramiro Canovas (born 1981), Argentine football center back
 Ramiro Carballo (born 1978), Salvadoran footballer
 Ramiro Carrera (born 1993), Argentine football midfielder
 Ramiro Cáseres (born 1994), Argentine footballer
 Ramiro Castro de la Mata (1931–2006), Peruvian physician
 Ramiro Castillo (1966–1997), Bolivian football midfielder
 Ramiro Cepeda (born 1975), Argentine football manager and player
 Ramiro Civita, Argentine cinematographer
 Ramiro Choc, Guatemalan Mayan peasant leader
 Ramiro L. Colón (1904–1983), general manager of the Cooperativa de Cafeteros de Puerto Rico
 Ramiro Corrales (born 1977), American soccer player
 Ramiro Cortés (1933–1984), American composer
 Ramiro Cortés (basketball) (born 1931), Uruguayan basketball player
 Ramiro Costa (born 1992), Argentine football striker

E-L
 Ramiro Estrada (born 1962), Mexican swimmer
 Ramiro Fassi (born 1982), Argentine football defender
 Ramiro Fergonzi (born 1989), Argentine football forward
 Ramiro Figueiras Amarelle (born 1977), Spanish beach soccer player
 Ramiro Fróilaz (1120–1169), Leonese magnate, statesman, and military leader
 Ramiro Funes Mori (born 1991), Argentine footballer
 Ramiro Garay (born 1997), Argentine football midfielder
 Ramiro Garcés (disambiguation), multiple people, including:
Ramiro Garcés of Viguera (died 981), king of Viguera
Ramiro Garcés, Lord of Calahorra (c. 1052–1083), second son of king García Sánchez III of Navarre
 Ramiro Georgescu (born 1982), Romanian water polo player
 Ramiro Hernández García (born 1954), Mexican politician
 Ramiro Herrera (born 1989), Argentine rugby union footballer
 Ramiro Ledesma Ramos (1905–1936), Spanish national syndicalist politician, essayist, and journalist
 Ramiro de León Carpio (1942–2002), President of Guatemala
 Ramiro de León (basketball) (1938–2007), Uruguayan basketball player
 Ramiro Leone (born 1977), Argentine football midfielder

M-O
 Ramiro Macagno (born 1997), Argentine football goalkeeper
 Ramiro de Maeztu (1875–1936), Spanish political theorist, journalist, literary critic, and diplomat
 Ramíro Mañalich (born 1887), Cuban fencer
 Ramiro Marino (born 1988), Argentine professional BMX cyclist
 Ramiro Martinez (disambiguation), multiple people, including:
Ramiro Martinez (police officer) (born 1937), American police officer
Ramiro Martínez (rugby union) (born 1970), Argentine-born Italian rugby union player
Ramiro Martinez (sportscaster) (1923–2015), Cuban sportscaster
Ramiro Martinez, Jr. (born 1962), American criminologist
 Ramiro Martins (born 1941), Portuguese cyclist
 Ramiro Mayor (born 1991), Spanish footballer
 Ramiro Mendoza (born 1972), Panamanian baseball pitcher
 Ramiro Moyano (born 1990), Argentine rugby union player
 Ramiro Navarro (born 1943), Mexican football forward
 Ramiro Núñez de Guzmán (c. 1600–1668), Spanish nobleman
 Ramiro Oliveros, Spanish film and television actor
 Ramiro Ortiz, Nicaraguan businessman
 Ramiro Ortíz (1903–1982), Puerto Rican sports shooter
 Ramiro Otero Lugones (1928–2013), Bolivian lawyer, docent and human rights defender

P-V
 Ramiro Peña (born 1985), Mexican baseball infielder
 Ramiro Pez (born 1978), Italian-Argentine rugby union footballer
 Ramiro Ponce Monroy, Guatemalan vice presidential candidate
 Ramiro Pruneda (born 1983), Mexican American football offensive tackle
 Ramiro Prialé (1904–1988), Peruvian politician
 Ramiro Quintana (born 1977), Argentine Olympic show jumping rider
 Ramiro Rampinelli (1697–1759), Italian mathematician and physicist
 Ramiro Reducindo (born 1979), Mexican boxer
 Ramiro Rodrigues Valente (born 1933), Brazilian footballer
 Ramiro Saavedra (born 1984), Peruvian singer
 Ramiro Sánchez (1070–1116), noble kinsman of the kings of Navarre
 Ramiro Saraiva Guerreiro (1918–2011), Brazilian politician and diplomat
 Ramiro Suárez Corzo (born 1960), Colombian politician
 Ramiro Valdés (born 1932), Cuban politician
 Ramiro Villapadierna (born 1964), Spanish reporter and observer

Surname
 Federico Ramiro (born 1962), Spanish basketball player
 Luis Ramiro (born 1976), Spanish singer-songwriter
 Marcelo Ramiro Camacho (born 1980), Brazilian footballer
 Rubén Ramiro Pastor (born 1993), Spanish football striker
 André Ramiro, A Brazilian actor

Nickname 

 Mauricio Hernández Norambuena (born 1958), Chilean guerrilla fighter, popularly known as "Commander Ramiro".

Spanish-language surnames
Spanish masculine given names